Ukrainian Scientific Society was a learned society established in Kyiv in 1907. It was predecessor of the National Academy of Sciences of Ukraine and later in 1921 it fully integrated within the last one. The society was created on the initiative of Mykhailo Hrushevsky and under his chairmanship on the example of the Shevchenko Scientific Society that existed in Lemberg (Austro-Hungary). The primary goal of the society was an organization of science work and its popularization through the Ukrainian language.

The society had several sections: historical, philological, natural-technical, medical, and statistical commissions.

External links
 Ukrainian Scientific Society at the Encyclopedia of Ukraine
 Notes of historical section — Notes of the Ukrainian Science Society

National Academy of Sciences of Ukraine
Organizations based in Kyiv
Organizations established in 1907
1907 establishments in Ukraine
Learned societies of Ukraine